The 1868 United States presidential election in Arkansas took place on November 3, 1868, as part of the 1868 United States presidential election. Voters chose five representatives, or electors to the Electoral College, who voted for president and vice president.

Republican Ulysses S. Grant became the first of his party to ever carry Arkansas, taking 53.68% of the state's vote to Democrat Horatio Seymour's 46.32%.

This was the first time since 1860 that a presidential election was held in the state due to its secession, the American Civil War, and Reconstruction. This was one of only two times in the 19th century that Arkansas backed a Republican candidate; the party would carry it once more in the next election, before waiting 100 years, until 1972, to win it again. This was also the last time until 1980 that the state backed a non-incumbent Republican.

Fourteen counties either did not vote or had their votes thrown out, because, according to Governor Powell Clayton, violence from Confederate militias made voter registration impossible. These counties are: Ashley, Bradley, Columbia, Craighead, Greene, Lafayette, Little River, Mississippi, Sevier, Woodruff, Conway, Crittenden, Drew, and Fulton.

Results

See also
 United States presidential elections in Arkansas

References

Arkansas
1868
1868 Arkansas elections